Chélieu is a commune in the Isère department in southeastern France.

Geography
The Bourbre flows northeast through the eastern part of the commune and forms part of its northeastern border.

Population

See also
Communes of the Isère department

References

Communes of Isère